The 1988 South American Rhythmic Gymnastics Championships were held in Rosario, Argentina, October 1988.

Medalists

References 

1988 in gymnastics
Rhythmic Gymnastics,1988
1988 South American Rhythmic Gymnastics Championships
1988 in Argentine sport